Zopfia rhizophila is a plant pathogen that causes Zopfia root rot in asparagus.

References

External links 
 Index Fungorum
 USDA ARS Fungal Database

Fungal plant pathogens and diseases
Vegetable diseases
Monocot diseases
Pleosporales
Taxa named by Gottlob Ludwig Rabenhorst